Jagalmadang is a red-light district located in Daegu, South Korea. Situated in the Dalseong-dong area of Daegu's Jung-gu district, it first emerged in the 1910s in the early period of Japanese rule. In the early 2000s, approximately fifty brothels were operating in Jagalmadang, employing some 270 prostitutes. However, following the passage of a special law against prostitution in 2004, many of these were forced to close.

Notes

Red-light districts in South Korea
Geography of Daegu